The 2007 Kebbi State gubernatorial election occurred on April 14, 2007. PDP candidate Usman Saidu Nasamu Dakingari won the election, defeating ANPP Farouk Bello Bunza and other 6 candidates.

Results
Usman Saidu Nasamu Dakingari from the PDP won the election. He defeated Farouk Bello Bunza of the ANPP. 8 candidates contested in the election.

The total number of registered voters in the state was 1,345,436.

Usman Saidu Nasamu Dakingari, (PDP)- 469,595
Farouk Bello Bunza, ANPP- 134,553
Abubakar Malam Abubakar, DPP- 133,800
Adamu Usman, NCP- 7,888
Muhammadu Inuwa Bawa, AC- 4,842
Abdullahi Ibrahim, ADC- 3,990
Salihu Isa Nataro,	NDP- 3,921
Abubakar Bala Danango, APGA- 3,798

References 

Kebbi State gubernatorial election
Kebbi State gubernatorial election
Kebbi State gubernatorial elections